Grove Primary School may refer to:

 Grove Primary School (South Africa), South Africa
 Grove Primary School, Frimley

See also
 Grove School (disambiguation)